Mitchell Hall may refer to:

Mitchell K. Hall, professor of history
Mitchell Hall (Eastern Oklahoma State College), Wilburton, Oklahoma, listed on the National Register of Historic Places (NRHP) in Latimer County
Mitchell Hall, at The George Washington University, Washington, D.C.

See also
Mitchell House (disambiguation)